Tatiana Torres (born September 7, 1988 in Cuenca, Ecuador) is a model and beauty pageant titleholder who assumed the crown of Miss Earth Ecuador 2012 before Estefanía Realpe was dethroned; she competed at Miss Earth 2012 but she was unplaced. She also competed at Miss Heritage 2013 and placed as 4th runner up.

Early life
She was born in Cuenca, and is a speaker of Spanish and English.

Miss Earth Ecuador 2012 
Torres was designed as Miss Earth Ecuador 2013 by the national director, José Hidalgo to compete in Miss Earth 2012, after the original selected was dethroned.

Miss Earth 2012 
Torres competed at Miss Earth 2012 but she was unplaced.

Miss Heritage 2013 
Torres also competed at Miss Heritage World 2013 The pageant re-branded and now is known as Miss Heritage and she placed 5th place.

External links
Official Miss Ecuador website
http://www.herald.co.zw/miss-heritage-world-models-start-arriving/
http://www.elmercurio.com.ec/407191-tatiana-torres-miss-heritage-ecuador-viaja-zimbabwe/#.Usk6GvQW2I8
http://statigr.am/p/613289792600083245_391744929

References 

 assumed

1988 births
Living people
Ecuadorian beauty pageant winners
Ecuadorian people of Spanish descent
Miss Earth 2012 contestants